Carol L. Neuman de Vegvar (born 1953)  is an art historian and Professor of Fine Arts at Ohio Wesleyan University.

Career
De Vagvar undertook undergraduate study at Bryn Mawr College before completing her PhD on Anglo-Saxon art in Northumbria in 1981 at the University of Pennsylvania. She was elected as a Fellow of the Society of Antiquaries of London on 5 June 2003.

Select publications
2008. "In Hoc Signo: The Cross on Secular Objects and the Process of Conversion", in Sarah Larratt Keefer, Karen L. Jolly, and Catherine E. Karkov (eds) Cross and Culture in Anglo-Saxon England: Studies in Honour of George Hardin Brown.Morgantown, West Virginia University Press. 79–117.
2007. "Converting the Insular Landscape: Crosses and Their Audiences", in Alastair Minnis and Jane Roberts (eds) Text, Image, Interpretation: Studies in Anglo-Saxon Literature in Honour of Éamonn Ó Carragáin. 407–29.
2006 (with Adam Daubney). "Lenton Keisby and Osgodby", Medieval Archaeology 50, 287.
2003. "Romanitas and Realpolitik in Cogitosus’s Description of the Church of St. Brigit, Kildare", in Martin Carver (ed) The Cross Goes North; Processes of Conversion in Northern Europe, AD 300–1300. Woodbridge, Boydell for York Medieval Press. 153–70.
1990. "The Origin of the Genoels-Elderen Ivories", Gesta 29(1)

References

Living people
Fellows of the Society of Antiquaries of London
1953 births
Ohio Wesleyan University faculty
University of Pennsylvania Law School alumni
Bryn Mawr College alumni
Medieval archaeologists